Marsha Collier (born in New York City) is an author, radio personality, podcast host, and educator specializing in technology, Internet marketing, and E-commerce.

Early career
Before her online career began, Collier owned and operated her own marketing and advertising firm, The Collier Company, and won numerous awards including “Small Businessperson of the Year” accolades from several organizations.

In 2003, her book Starting an eBay Business For Dummies appeared on the BusinessWeek list of best-selling paperback business books. In December 2011, her book Ultimate Online Customer Service Guide: How to Connect with Your Customers to Sell More ranked #4 among "What Corporate America Is Reading." By 2013, her book eBay For Dummies was one of the best sellers on the topic. As of 2016, with over 1 million copies of her books in print, she was the all-time best selling eBay author. She hosts the Computer and Technology Radio podcast with broadcaster Mark Cohen.

eBay and eCommerce

Collier started her eBay career during the site's nascent years, becoming one of the site's first successful sellers. From there, Collier became an eBay Top Rated Seller., and later, decided to co-author the first edition of eBay For Dummies, which was published in 1999. Collier co-authored the first edition with Roland Woerner and Stephanie Becker, and became the sole author of the series, beginning with the second edition. The series is currently in its tenth edition.

In 2001, Collier expanded the eponymous series to reach individuals interested in making eBay their full-time profession, Starting an eBay Business For Dummies. The series is currently in its fourth edition. Soon after, Collier went on to teach at eBay University as an instructor.

In 2003, her book Starting an eBay Business For Dummies appeared on the BusinessWeek list of best-selling paperback business books.

In December 2005, Collier hosted the Public Broadcasting Service (PBS) Public television program Making Your Fortune Online, a complete guide to starting and operating an online business.  The two-hour program, shot in front of a live studio audience in San Francisco, was a full seminar on conceiving a business idea, finding products or services to sell, finding the best sites for your products, and understanding the legal, operational and tax issues related to having a successful online business.

In 2008, Collier was named one of 20 iCitizens in the book The Open Brand: When Push Comes to Pull in a Web-Made World by Kelly Mooney. That same year, she gave the luncheon keynote at the Online Market World conference in San Francisco.

In December 2011, her book Ultimate Online Customer Service Guide: How to Connect with Your Customers to Sell More ranked #4 among "What Corporate America Is Reading."

By 2013, her book eBay For Dummies was one of the best sellers on the topic. As of 2016, with over 1 million copies of her books in print, she was the all-time best selling eBay author. She hosts the Computer and Technology Radio podcast with broadcaster Mark Cohen.

Journalism

In 2014, Collier was a columnist with American Express OPEN. She is also on the board of advisors for Buysafe, a bonding service for online sellers. She also wrote about business trends for American Express, Social Business for IBM, Pitney Bowes and multiple features on Entrepreneur.

Podcast
Collier co-hosts a podcast, Marsha Collier & Marc Cohen Techradio with former KABC journalist Marc Cohen, which they have run since 2008

Public Speaking
Collier has spoken at universities and conferences translating the use of social media into social commerce, including:
 Trust In Tech Symposium 2019: Trust without borders London (2019) 
 140 Character Conference Los Angeles (2016) and London (2009)
 Parallels Cloud Summit Keynote (2012)
 eBay Radio Party & Conference (2011, 2013, 2014, 2015) 
 SXSW 2013: Real Talk: The Social Customer Service Shift
 Retail Global 2014
 IBM Social Business Futurists Insights Series 3-minute YouTube video (2015)
 Blogworld (2009, 2010, and 2011) 
PayPal x Innovate 2009 
iCitizen (2008)

Accolades

She has also been named in online lists:
ICMI's Top 50 Contact Center Thought Leaders on Twitter (2014, 2015, 2016, 2017, 2018)
 Brand Quarterly Magazine: 50 Marketing Leaders Over 50 2014, 2015
 Scott Goodson in Forbes: Must-Follow Marketing Minds On Twitter 2014
 Huffington Post: 100 Must Follow On Twitter 2014
 Social Marketing 2016: Top 100 Influencers and Brands 
 Content Marketing 2017: Top 200 Global Influencers 
 Top 100 Most Social Customer Services Pros on Twitter

Bibliography

Books

 eBay For Dummies 1999, 2000, 2002, 2004, 2006, 2009, 2012, 2014, 2016, 2020
 Twitter and Facebook For Seniors For Dummies 2010, 2014
 eBay Business All-in-One for Dummies 2006, 2007, 2009, 2013, 2018
 Facebook, Twitter & Instagram for Seniors (For Dummies) 2018
 Social Media Commerce For Dummies 2012
 Facebook fúr Senioren Fúr Dummies (Germany) 2012
 The Ultimate Online Customer Service Guide: How to Connect with your Customers to Sell More 2011 (Audible 2012)
 Facebook fúr Senioren Fúr Dummies (Germany) 2012
 AARP Facebook: Tech To Connect 2012
 eBay For Seniors For Dummies 2009
 Making Money on eBay For Dummies (Pocket Edition) 2009
 eBay PowerSeller Business Practices For Dummies 2008
 eBay Timesaving Techniques For Dummies 2004
 eBay Listings That Sell For Dummies 2006
 Starting an eBay Business For Dummies 2001, 2004, 2011
 Starting an E-Bay Business for Dummies (Playaway Audio) 2009
 PayPal For Dummies (forward) 2005
 eBay Bargain Shopping For Dummies 2003
 Santa Shops on eBay 2006
 eBay Para Dummies (Spanish) 2004
 eBay-Schnappchen Fur Dummies (German) 2004
 Mein eBay-Shop (German) 2005
 开创你的eBay商务 玛莎•科莉尔，，，美国 (Chinese) 2007
 eBay Pour Les Nuls (French) 2006
 eBay Per Negati (Italian) 2008
 eBay For Dummies adapted for Australia 2006
 eBay For Canadians For Dummies 2006, 2008
 Starting an eBay Business For Canadians For Dummies 2006, 2008
 eBay.co.uk For Dummies 2006, 2008
 Starting a Business on eBay.co.uk for Dummies 2006, 2008
 eBay.co.uk Business All-in-One for Dummies 2009
 The Internet GigaBook For Dummies (Co-Author) 2004

References

External links
Marsha Collier's Blog

Portland State University 2011
PayPal Innovate 2010
Singapore Infocomm 2016
Huawei Trust In Tech Symposium

Year of birth missing (living people)
Living people
Writers from New York (state)
American educators
American finance and investment writers